A Miner's Romance is a 1914 American silent Western film featuring Lon Chaney and Murdock MacQuarrie. It is unknown who directed this film. The film is now considered to be lost.

Plot
John Burns (Lon Chaney) is chased by a bear and falls off a cliff. A young miner named Bob Jenkins finds the unconscious Burns and takes him to his cabin. Bob nurses Burns back to health and they become friends. Dave Williams and his beautiful daughter Lucy arrive in town, and she and Bob soon fall in love. Burns also falls in love with her, but she clearly prefers Bob.

Filled with jealousy, Burns plots to kill Bob and rigs a gun in Bob's cabin with a string connecting the doorknob to the gun's trigger, so that Bob will be shot when he opens the cabin door. His plan backfires however when some mice chew through the string. Bob finds the gun later and realizing it was set up to kill him, he purposely fires off a shot. Burns, thinking that Bob is dead, drags Lucy off into the wilderness, but Bob leads a posse to rescue her and Burns is killed.

Cast
 Murdock MacQuarrie as Bob Jenkins
 Agnes Vernon as Lucy Williams
 Lon Chaney as John Burns
 Seymour Hastings as Dave Williams

Reception
Moving Picture World stated: "The scenic effects about the placer camp are good; the story contains some old features, but holds the attention."

References

External links
 

1914 films
1914 Western (genre) films
1914 lost films
1914 short films
American silent short films
American black-and-white films
Lost Western (genre) films
Lost American films
Silent American Western (genre) films
Universal Pictures short films
1910s American films
1910s English-language films